Albert Read (30 March 1893 – 26 October 1959) was an English international footballer, who played as a centre half.

Career
Born in Ealing, Read played for Tufnell Park, and earned one cap for England in 1921.

References

1893 births
1959 deaths
English footballers
England international footballers
Tufnell Park F.C. players
Association football midfielders